The Princess Point complex (also called the Princess Point culture) is an archaeological culture of the Middle to Late Woodland period of northeastern North America.

The complex marked a transition between the latter part of the Middle Woodland period and the early Late Woodland period. One date estimate places the time period of the Princess Point complex as lasting from around 500 CE to around 1000 CE. It later developed into the Glen Meyer culture.

Named for its type site at Princess Point near modern-day Hamilton, Ontario, Canada, the complex was present in the area between the Grand River and the Niagara Peninsula.

It is characterized by a horticultural economy, including the cultivation of maize, as well as aspects of sedentism. It was originally conceptualized by the archaeologist David Marvyn Stothers.

Characteristics and social changes
The Princess Point marked a transition to early maize-based agriculture and an increasingly sedentary way of life. Stothers describes Princess Point maize cultivation as "developmental-experimental", and notes the appearance of palisaded agricultural villages containing proto-longhouses. Maize cultivation as a supplement to foraged foods began at least as early as 500 CE. James V. Wright linked the Princess Point culture with the introduction of maize agriculture into Ontario.

There was a general westward geographic shift in focus during this period, with the appearance of sites such as the Glass site (AgHb-5) on the western bank of the Grand River. By the end phase of this Grand River focus, however, occupation had shifted away from river-adjacent floodplains to well-drained sandy hills and plains in modern-day Norfolk County, which were more suitable for maize agriculture.

Early maize cultivation in Ontario
The Princess Point culture is linked to the introduction of maize to Ontario. This was initially believed in the 1970s to have occurred around AD 650. Later accelerator mass spectrometry (AMS) testing done in the mid-1990s on samples from the Grand Banks site (AfGx-3) returned a calibrated radiocarbon date of AD 540.

Archaeological framework
David Marvyn Stothers developed the Princess Point complex as an archaeological framework in the late 1960s and early 1970s. His definition of it as a complex was rooted in an understanding of "Princess Point" as being widely distributed; therefore, it was divided into three regional foci (the Point Pelee, Ausable, and Grand River) and three phases falling within an original date range of AD 600 to AD 900.

William Fox later revised this framework, proposing instead that the Princess Point complex should be more narrowly defined around the Grand River focus, with the Ausable focus being excluded as too poorly documented, and the Point Pelee focus assigned to the Riviere au Vase phase of the Western Basin tradition. The timescale was also narrowed to AD 650–900.

Foci and sites
Stothers divided the Princess Point complex into a set of three regional foci composed of clusters of similar sites. In a 1973 list, these were:

Grand River focus
 Surma site
 Orchid site
 Martin site
 Jordan Harbour site
 Reimer site
 Selkirk #5
 Selkirk #2
 Port Maitland site
 Newman site (AfGv-3)
 Cayuga Bridge site (AfGx-1)
 Grand Banks site (AfGx-3)
 Indiana site
 Middleport site (Princess Point component)
 Glass site (AgHb-5)
 Porteous site (AgHb-1)transitional Princess PointGlen Meyer site
 Mohawk Chapel
 Princess Point
 Rat Island

Point Pelee focus
 Indian Clearing (AbHl-4)
 Kreiger site
 Van Hooste site
 Cummings site

Ausable focus
 Smith site (AhHk-1)
 Fox site (AhHk-29)
 Bear site (AhHk-31)
 Pinery site (AhHl-12)

As well, the Forster site is a notable Princess Point site which also contained a Glen Meyer component.

See also

 Point Peninsula complex
 History of agriculture in Canada

References

Citations

Bibliography

Further reading

 
 
 
 
 
 

Iroquoian peoples
Middle Woodland period
Archaeological cultures in Ontario
History of agriculture in Canada
Maize production
First Nations history
1st millennium in Canada